New Coat of Paint is the title of a tribute album to Tom Waits, released in 2000 by Manifesto Records. The songs are performed by various artists.

Track listing
All songs written by Tom Waits. Performers are listed for each track.

 "Whistlin' Past the Graveyard" - [03:37] Screamin' Jay Hawkins
 "Pasties and a G-String" - [02:23] Andre Williams
 "Heartattack and Vine" - [05:07] Lydia Lunch feat. Nels Cline
 "Virginia Avenue" - [03:23] Knoxville Girls
 "Romeo Is Bleeding" - [03:33] Dexter Romweber's Infernal Racket
 "New Coat of Paint" - [03:43] Lee Rocker
 "Broken Bicycles" - [03:49] Botanica
 "Old Boyfriends" - [04:45] Preacher Boy
 "Please Call Me, Baby" - [05:10] Sally Norvell
 "On The Nickel" - [05:45] Carla Bozulich
 "Muriel" - [03:59] Eleni Mandell
 "Poncho's Lament" - [04:27] The Blacks
 "Christmas Card from a Hooker in Minneapolis" - [03:41] Neko Case
 "Blue Skies" - [03:08] Floyd Dixon

2000 compilation albums
Tom Waits tribute albums
Manifesto Records compilation albums
Rock compilation albums